Frank Noel Tuff (26 November 1889 – 5 November 1915) was an English first-class cricketer. The son of a Conservative Party Member of Parliament, Tuff played first-class cricket for Oxford University and the Free Foresters, before serving in the First World War, in which he was killed from wounds sustained during a bomb accident while taking part in the Gallipoli Campaign.

Life, cricket and WWI service
Tuff was born at Rochester, Kent in November 1889, the son of Charles Tuff and his wife, Mary Ann Tuff. He was educated at the Abbey School in Beckenham, before going up to Malvern College, where he played for the college cricket team for three years. From Malvern he went up to Brasenose College, Oxford, where he studied law. While studying at Oxford he made his debut in first-class cricket for Oxford University against the Gentlemen of England at Oxford in 1910. He made eight further first-class appearances for Oxford University across the 1910 and 1911 seasons, scoring 128 runs with a high score of 34 not out, while with his right-arm medium-fast bowling he took 18 wickets at an average of 30.55, with best figures of 5 for 28. Tuff also represented the combined Oxford and Cambridge Universities cricket team in a first-class match against a combined Army and Navy cricket team at Aldershot in 1910, in which he also took a five wicket haul with figures of 7 for 47 in the Army and Navy first-innings. He gained a blue in 1910. In addition to playing cricket for the university, he also played football for Oxford University A.F.C. and Corinthians. He married Muriel Mary Smith in 1912. He made a final appearance in first-class cricket for the Free Foresters against Oxford University in 1914.

Tuff served in the British Army during World War I, enlisting with the Royal East Kent Mounted Rifles as a Second Lieutenant in June 1915. He saw action during the Gallipoli Campaign and was seriously wounded in a bomb accident at Cape Helles. He was evacuated to Malta, where he died from his wounds on 5 November 1915. He was buried at the Pietà Military Cemetery.

References

External links

1889 births
1915 deaths
People from Rochester, Kent
People educated at Malvern College
Alumni of Brasenose College, Oxford
English footballers
Oxford University A.F.C. players
Corinthian F.C. players
English cricketers
Oxford University cricketers
Oxford and Cambridge Universities cricketers
Free Foresters cricketers
Royal East Kent Yeomanry officers
British Army personnel of World War I
British military personnel killed in World War I
Burials at Pietà Military Cemetery
Association footballers not categorized by position